The 1952–53 Michigan Wolverines men's basketball team represented the University of Michigan in intercollegiate basketball during the 1952–53 season.  The team finished the season in a tie for ninth place in the Big Ten Conference with an overall record of 6–16 and 3–15 against conference opponents.

William Perigo was in his first year as the team's head coach.  Paul Groffsky was the team's leading scorer with 301 points in 22 games for an average of 13.6 points per game.  Doug Lawrence was the team captain.

Statistical leaders

References

Michigan
Michigan Wolverines men's basketball seasons
Michigan Wolverines basketball
Michigan Wolverines basektball